Li Xiang is a Chinese breaststroke swimmer.

He competed at the 2015 World Aquatics Championships and at the 2016 Summer Olympics in Rio de Janeiro.

References

Year of birth missing (living people)
Living people
Chinese male breaststroke swimmers
Olympic swimmers of China
Swimmers at the 2016 Summer Olympics
Swimmers from Tianjin
Asian Games medalists in swimming
Asian Games gold medalists for China
Asian Games bronze medalists for China
Swimmers at the 2014 Asian Games
Medalists at the 2014 Asian Games
21st-century Chinese people